Wilfrid Norman Bailey (born 5 September 1893 Consett, Durham; died 23 October 1961, Eastbourne) was a mathematician who introduced Bailey's lemma and Bailey pairs into the theory of basic hypergeometric series. Bailey chains and Bailey transforms are named after him.

References

External links
 

20th-century British mathematicians
1893 births
1961 deaths